Den of Thieves is the second full-length album by Canadian rock band The Trews. It was released in 2005 on Epic Records, and peaked at number 6 on the Canadian Albums Chart.

The first single from this album was "So She's Leaving", and it was followed by "Yearning", "Poor Ol' Broken Hearted Me" and "I Can't Say".

The album was certified Gold (50,000 copies) by the CRIA in January 2006.

Track listing

"Fire Up Ahead" – 3:01
"Makin' Sunshine" – 3:47
"Cry" – 3:41
"Sweetness" – 3:33
"I Can't Say" – 4:19
"So She's Leaving" – 3:08
"Yearning" – 3:58
"The Pearl (More Than Everything)"  – 4:50
"Poor Ol' Broken Hearted Me"  – 4:18
"Ana & Mia" – 3:20
"Naked"  – 4:00
"Montebello Park"  – 3:58
"Got Myself to Blame"  – 3:24
"The Traveling Kind" – 3:26
"Ishmael & Maggie"  – 4:20

On the U.S. release, "The Pearl (More Than Everything)" was replaced with "Tired of Waiting" from the Trews' previous album, House of Ill Fame.

European Version
"Fire Up Ahead" – 3:02
"Makin' Sunshine" – 3:48
"Cry" – 3:41
"Sweetness" – 3:33
"I Can't Say" – 4:19
"So She's Leaving" – 3:08
"Takes Me a While"  – 2:51
"Yearning" – 3:58
"Poor Ol' Broken Hearted Me"  – 4:17
"Den of Thieves"  – 3:55
"Ana & Mia" – 3:20
"Naked"  – 4:00
"Got Myself to Blame"  – 3:24
"The Traveling Kind" – 3:26
"Ishmael & Maggie"  – 11:24

Personnel 
Daniel J. Coe – arranger, programming
Sean Dalton – percussion, drums, backing vocals
Jack Douglas – percussion, backing vocals, producer
Attila Fias – piano, Hammond organ
Kelly Hoppe – harmonica
Michael Jack – engineer
Amoy Levy – backing vocals
Colin MacDonald – rhythm guitar, keyboards, vocals
John-Angus MacDonald – banjo, guitar, mandolin, rhythm guitar, harmonium, keyboards, backing vocals, melodica, lap steel guitar
Andrew MacNaughtan – photography
Steve McDade – horn
Gord Myers – horn
Mark Renner – assistant engineer
Jack Syperek – bass, harmonium, backing vocals
Steve Wingfield – horn

References

 

2005 albums
The Trews albums
Albums produced by Jack Douglas (record producer)
Epic Records albums
RED Distribution albums